Sparry is a surname. Notable people with the surname include:

Franz Sparry (1715–1767), composer
Richard Sparry, English politician